Tod Ensign (d. May 2014) was an American veterans' rights lawyer and Director of Citizen Soldier, a non-profit GI and veterans rights advocacy group based in New York City.  Ensign held two law degrees, a Master of Laws (LLM) from NYU and Juris Doctor (J.D.) from Wayne State University, as well as a BA from Michigan State University.

Veteran's rights activism
Ensign co-founded Citizen Soldier in 1969 to advocate on behalf of GIs and veterans who work to oppose command-tolerated racism, sexism, homophobia and militarism.  Currently, the group has 7,500 members nationwide, who provide nearly all of its financial support.  As an attorney, Ensign has participated in a broad range of legal cases involving GIs and veterans over the past 35 years.  Two notable cases are the Agent Orange class action, which attempted to hold chemical manufacturers liable for the injuries their herbicide caused Vietnam veterans and their offspring and the Vietnam-Era Winter Soldier Investigation and National Veterans Inquiry.

Following the invasion of Iraq in 2003, Citizen Soldier attorneys, including Ensign, counseled hundreds of GIs and reservists seeking alternatives to serving in what many regard as an illegal war.  The most celebrated case was Citizen Soldier's defense of Sgt. Camilo Mejia, 28 of Miami, Florida.  Mejia was the first US combat veteran to refuse further service in Iraq.  He based his refusal on his duty, on international law, that it is illegal to obey military orders that violate international law.  During his five months in Iraq, he claims he witnessed command-sanctioned shooting of civilians, abuse of detainees and other violations.  Mejia’s defense team has appealed the military judge’s refusal to allow any expert testimony at his court martial regarding illegal US military operations by his unit.

Ensign founded The Different Drummer coffeehouse near Watertown, NY, which strove to connect and inform service members.

Beginning in 2000, Ensign served on the executive board of the National Gulf War Resource Center, a coalition of Gulf War advocacy groups that advocates for research and health care for veterans from both Gulf wars.  (He was the only non-veteran serving on this board).

Publications

Ensign was author of two books, Military Life: The Insider's Guide (Prentice Hall, 2000) and  America's Military Today: The Challenge of Militarism (New Press, 2004). He was coauthor of GI Guinea Pigs (Playboy, 1980) the first exposé of how US soldiers were harmed by nuclear fallout during A-bomb tests and the herbicide Agent Orange that was used during the Vietnam War.

He also contributed chapters to four other books, Ten Excellent Reasons Not to Join the Military (New Press, 2006)  Against the Vietnam War: Writings by Activists (Syracuse U. Press, 1999), Metal of Dishonor: Depleted Uranium (IAC Press, 1997) Collateral Damage (South Press.  He has written dozens of articles for The Progressive, In These Times, Radical America, The American Pathologist, The N. Y. Daily News, Toward Freedom, Against the Current, the Weekly Guardian, the Non Violent Resister, the Indypendent, and several others.

He had one daughter.

References

External links

Citizen Soldier's website

Year of birth missing
2014 deaths
New York University School of Law alumni
Wayne State University alumni
Michigan State University alumni
American anti–Vietnam War activists
American anti–Iraq War activists
American veterans' rights activists